Marowin Brook is a creek in Upper Rollins Plains, New South Wales, located at  -31.183330 152.600000. and height of 110 metres   The unspoilt riverine system is located wholly within Kumbatine National Park.

The Stream flows into the Wilson River. The area is covered in Blackbutt and Tallowwood trees, some 80 meters in height.  The climate is subtropical. The temperatures average 17 °C .  The hottest month is January, which averages 22 °C, and the coldest month is July, with 10 °C. The rainfall averaged 1,846 millimeters annually.  The wettest month is February, with 373 millimeters of rain and the driest month is September, with 34 mm of rain.

References

Rivers of New South Wales
Mid North Coast